"Proper Crimbo" is a Christmas song written and performed by the creator of the British comedy programme Bo' Selecta!, Leigh Francis, featuring various artists. "Crimbo" is an English slang term for Christmas. Released in December 2003, the single peaked at number four on the UK Singles Chart and remained in the charts for nine weeks.

Artists
 The 3AM Girls
 4 Poofs and a Piano
 Simon Amstell
 Ade Adepitan
 Richard Bacon
 Chris Bisson
 Melanie Blatt
 Edith Bowman
 Melanie Brown
 Adam Buxton
 Jimmy Carr
 Joe Cornish
 Terri Dwyer
 Jenni Falconer
 Caroline Flack
 Leigh Francis
 Kirsty Gallacher
 Bob Geldof
 Jade Goody
 David Gray
 Christine Hamilton
 Harvey
 Katy Hill
 Kerry Katona
 John Leslie
 Chris Moyles
 Dermot O'Leary
 Gavin Rossdale
 Denise van Outen
 Ozzy Rezat
 Ben Shephard
 David Sneddon
 Kate Thornton
Holly Valance
 Matthew Wright

Music video
The music video for the song sees Francis perform as other characters over the track. The video begins with Matthew Wright and Michael Jackson driving through the woods at night, before their car breaks down. Jackson then turns into a variety of animals, and then John Leslie gives chase to Wright before Craig David and the other characters start performing the song.

Track listing

Charts

References

2003 singles
British Christmas songs
Christmas novelty songs